Behold! A Pale Horse is the debut album of the Bellingham, Washington, band The Ghost and the Grace, a moniker for the founder/creator Daniel Anderson (of Idiot Pilot fame). The album is based loosely on the concept of death and dying.

Track listing

Personnel
Taken from CD liner:
Daniel Anderson - Vocals, banjo, guitar, bass, mandolin, piano, keyboard, percussion, programming, accordion, glockenspiel, vibraphone, string and horn arrangements
Chip Westerfield - Additional guitar on "Cloud of Flies"and "My Shell Is Broken", and additional bass on "How Far You Go" and "The End"
Ryan Soukkala - Additional percussion
Stephanie Warmouth - Additional vocals on "The End"
Produced by Daniel Anderson
Co-produced by Chip Westerfield
Mixed and recorded at Bayside Recording, Bellingham, Washington, and Anderson's home, Bellingham, Washington, by Daniel Anderson and Chip Westerfield
Engineering by Daniel Anderson
Additional engineering by Chip Westerfield
Mastered by Paul Turpin at Bayside Recording, Bellingham, Washington
Creative direction and design by Karl Peterson.

References

External links
 The Ghost and The Grace Official Website

2009 debut albums
The Ghost and the Grace albums